Early morning may refer to:
 the early part of the morning
 Early Morning, a 1968 play by Edward Bond
 Early Morning (song), a 1991 song

See also 
 At Early Morning, a 1965 Soviet film